The Mad Bomber, a.k.a. The Police Connection and Detective Geronimo, is a 1972 film produced, directed, and scripted by Bert I. Gordon. It stars Vince Edwards, Chuck Connors and Neville Brand.

Plot
William Dorn, a middle-aged man in Los Angeles, rigs and sets off bombs in places he associates with the drug-overdose death of his daughter and the collapse of his life. Investigating detective Geronimo Minnelli learns that at one of the locations of his attacks, a hospital, a rape took place, and both the victim and her rapist likely saw the face of the as-yet-unidentified bomber. The police desperately attempt to simultaneously identify and apprehend both violent criminals, hoping one will lead them to the other.

Cast
Vince Edwards as Geronimo Minelli
Chuck Connors as William Dorn
Neville Brand as George Fromley
Hank Brandt as Blake
Ted Gehring as Police Chief Marc C. Forester
Christina Hart as Fromley's victim

Home media
It was released on DVD as The Mad Bomber by Geneon on October 4, 2005, and as part of the same company's six-disc Cinema Deluxe Terror Pack on December 5, 2005. This release presented an edited-for-television cut of the movie. The full uncut version was released as The Police Connection by Code Red DVD on DVD in 2013, and upgraded to Blu-Ray limited to only 1,000 units in 2016; both releases are now out of print.

References

External links

1972 films
Films directed by Bert I. Gordon
1970s crime drama films
1972 drama films
1970s English-language films